James Lawson, Lord Lawson was a 16th-century Scottish lawyer and politician. He was both a Senator of the College of Justice from 1532 and Provost of Edinburgh in 1532. He was one of the first nine Senators of Justice, at the point of their creation in the Scottish legal system.

He was the grandson of Richard Lawson of High Riggs three times Lord Provost. His father was James Lawson, MP for Edinburgh in the Scottish Parliament in 1526, 1531 and 1532 (elections were annual).

Family

He was married to Janet Elphinstone, Lady Lawson. Lady Lawson Street in Edinburgh, which adjoins High Riggs, is named after her.

In 1568 his grandson, John Lawson of High Riggs, made complaint to the Town Council that the Flodden Wall had been built in such a way as to cause the flooding of his property. In 1573 the Council declared parts of his building at High Riggs as unsafe and a public danger. This house known as the Over Bow was demolished in 1877.

References

Scottish lawyers
Senators of the College of Justice
Lawyers from Edinburgh
Lord Provosts of Edinburgh
16th-century Scottish politicians